Maryna Konieva (born October 19, 1987 in Kharkiv) is a taekwondo athlete from Ukraine who took part in the London Olympics 2012. She won the Bronze Medal in the 2008 European Taekwondo Championships.

2012 London Olympics
Konieva beat Nadin Dawani 18–13 in the preliminary round.  She went on to lose 2—16 in the quarterfinals to Glenhis Hernandez.

See also

 Taekwondo at the 2012 Summer Olympics – Women's +67 kg

External links 
sports-reference.com

References 

1987 births
Ukrainian female taekwondo practitioners
Living people
Olympic taekwondo practitioners of Ukraine
Taekwondo practitioners at the 2012 Summer Olympics
Sportspeople from Kharkiv
Taekwondo practitioners at the 2015 European Games
European Games competitors for Ukraine
European Taekwondo Championships medalists